Micah Hannemann (born August 15, 1994) is a former American football safety. He played college football at Brigham Young. He is the brother of professional baseball player Jacob Hannemann.

Professional career

Cleveland Browns
Hannemann was signed by the Cleveland Browns as an undrafted free agent on April 28, 2018. He was waived on August 18, 2018.

Los Angeles Chargers
On August 19, 2018, Hannemann was claimed off waivers by the Los Angeles Chargers. He was waived on September 1, 2018.

Salt Lake Stallions
On December 22, 2018, Hannemann signed with the Salt Lake Stallions of the Alliance of American Football. The league ceased operations in April 2019.

Tampa Bay Vipers
Hannermann was drafted in the sixth round during phase four in the 2020 XFL Draft by the Tampa Bay Vipers. He had his contract terminated when the league suspended operations on April 10, 2020.

References

External links
BYU Cougars bio
Cleveland Browns bio
San Diego Chargers bio

Living people
21st-century Mormon missionaries
American football defensive backs
American sportspeople of Samoan descent
BYU Cougars football players
Cleveland Browns players
Los Angeles Chargers players
Salt Lake Stallions players
People from Alpine, Utah
Players of American football from Hawaii
Players of American football from Utah
1994 births
Tampa Bay Vipers players